Total Terror is the second of two self-released cassette tapes by industrial music band Front Line Assembly.  At this point, Bill Leeb was the band's only dedicated member, with some help from Rhys Fulber. It was mostly remastered and rereleased on CD in 1993 as Total Terror I, and followed up by a companion collection of same-period demos, Total Terror II, a year later. These have been collected into Complete Total Terror. One track, "Eternal", from the original cassette remains un-rereleased.

In Germany both CDs were released 1993 by now defunct label Dossier.

Original cassette track listing

Total Terror I
Most of the original cassette was later remastered and commercially released on CD in 1993 as Total Terror I (fully titled Total Terror Part I: Official Demos 1986) on Cleopatra Records and Dossier. It does not include "Eternal", which remains unreleased on CD or vinyl, but added three previously-unreleased bonus tracks from other sessions in 1986: "Freedom", "Distorted Vision" and "Cleanser".

The German release gave some explanations about the production and the reason for the release on the back cover:

Total Terror II
Total Terror II, a collection of 1986–1987 remastered Front Line Assembly demos, was released on Cleopatra Records in 1994, fulfilling the promise latent in the title of the previous year's Total Terror I. It included 13 previously-unreleased tracks:

Complete Total Terror
Total Terror I and Total Terror II were combined and re-reissued in a two-CD package, with new cover art, called Complete Total Terror in 2004 on Cleopatra.  Despite its name, it does not include the long-missing "Eternal", which remains unreleased on CD .

Personnel
 Bill Leeb – remixing (Rerelease 1993), vocals
 Rhys Fulber – remixing (Rerelease 1993)

References

Front Line Assembly albums
1986 albums
1993 albums